Maness may refer to:

Maness, Virginia, a community in Lee County
Maness (surname)